Umar ibn Ubayd Allah ibn Ma'mar al-Taymi (died 702 or 703) was a commander of the Zubayrid and Umayyad caliphates in their wars with the Kharijites and the chief of the Banu Taym clan of the Quraysh in the late 7th century.

Early life
Umar was the son of Ubayd Allah ibn Ma'mar ibn Uthman ibn Amr ibn Ka'b ibn Taym of the Banu Taym clan of the Quraysh. The Quraysh was the tribe of the Islamic prophet Muhammad and the caliphs (leaders of the Muslim community). The first caliph, Abu Bakr, belonged to the Banu Taym, as did Talha, a prominent companion of Muhammad, a leading member of the community after his death in 632, and one of the wealthiest figures of the early Muslim state. Umar's grandfather, Ma'mar, was Talha's paternal uncle, and a companion of Muhammad, who converted to Islam with the bulk of the Quraysh after the conquest of Mecca in 630. Ubayd Allah was a commander in the conquest of the major Sasanian fortress city of Istakhr in Fars and most likely died during the operation, though the sources cite different years (643–644, 649–650, or 650–651).

Umar became the leader of the Banu Taym clan in the following years. After the death of the fourth caliph Ali, the Syria-based Umayyads gained the caliphate, but in 680–683, opponents of Umayyad rule revolted, launching the Second Muslim Civil War. The Umayyads lost control over most the Caliphate's territories, with Iraq, Iran and Arabia falling under the rule of the Mecca-based caliph, Abd Allah ibn al-Zubayr in 683–684. Under Ibn al-Zubayr, a grandson of Abu Bakr, the Banu Taym attained a measure of influence in the state.

Service under the Zubayrids
The Zubayrids' main challenge in Iraq was the ruler of Kufa, al-Mukhtar al-Thaqafi, who ruled in the name of the son of Caliph Ali, Muhammad ibn al-Hanafiyya. The Zubayrid governor of Basra, Mus'ab ibn al-Zubayr, went on the offensive against al-Mukhtar in 686, appointing Umar as the commander of the left wing of his army at the Battle of Harura.

Fight against the Kharijites in Iran
Mus'ab appointed Umar the governor of Fars, the province in southern Iran centered in Istakhr. He fended off an attack by the Azariqa, a Kharijite faction opposed to both the Umayyads and the Zubayrids, at Shapur in 687. He pursued them to Istakhr, where after a tough battle in which he lost his son, Umar put the Azariqa to flight at the Tamastan bridge near the city. The Azariqa cut the bridge and dispersed to Kirman and Isfahan. Having rebuilt their strength, the Azariqa launched a major offensive against Basra and passed through areas in Fars on the way there. Umar, fearing Mus'ab's wrath should the Azariqa cross through his province to attack Mus'ab in Basra, pursued them. His forces were unable to overtake the Azariqa and they made camp at Ahwaz, a province adjacent to Basra from which they launched their assaults on the city.

Governor of Basra
While Mus'ab went on campaign to face the Umayyad caliph Abd al-Malik, he appointed Umar as governor of Basra. During this time, a pro-Umayyad uprising broke out in the area of Jufra outside Basra led by an Umayyad family member, Khalid ibn Abdallah ibn Khalid ibn Asid. The fighting lasted twenty-four or forty days, during which Umar was reinforced by men sent by Mus'ab. The uprising ended with the withdrawal of Khalid to Syria and the punishment of the pro-Umayyad tribal soldiers who remained in Basra by Mus'ab's order. Abd al-Malik defeated Mus'ab in 691 and the Umayyads killed Ibn al-Zubayr in Mecca the following year, bring most of the Caliphate under their rule.

Service under the Umayyads

Suppression of the Kharijites in Arabia
Abd al-Malik pardoned Umar for his service with the Zubayrids. Umar thereafter became a close ally of Abd al-Malik. Abd al-Malik appointed Umar to lead a campaign against Abu Fudayk, the leader of the Kharijite Najdat faction which had taken over eastern Arabia during the civil war. Abu Fudayk had repulsed two armies previously dispatched by Mus'ab. 
The Umayyad governor of Basra, Khalid, who had led the pro-Umayyad revolt at Jufra, sent his brother Umayya with an army against Abu Fudayk. The latter routed this force, humiliating Umayya and Khalid. 

Abd al-Malik guaranteed Umar that the governors of Kufa and Basra, from which he had to levy troops, would not infringe on his command. Umar departed Damascus with 3,000 Syrian soldiers. On the way, he recruited 8,000 fighters from Kufa, who he put under Muhammad ibn Musa, a grandson of Talha, and another 10,000 from Basra, who he put under the command of his Muhammad's brother. Umar marched his army to Bahrayn and confronted Abu Fudayk, whose Kharijite force was bolstered by Bedouin warriors. The two sides fought for five days at al-Mushaqqar. Abu Fudayk gained an early advantage, but due to the "courage and skill" of Umar, according to the historian A. A. Dixon, the Umayyad force defeated and killed Abu Fudayk. Umar had his men pursued and most of the non-Arabs in their ranks killed, while captured Arabs were freed. His victory spelled the end of the Najdat. Umar was afterward appointed governor of Bahrayn.

Death
Umar died near Damascus in 702 or 703. He had been on his way to intercede with Abd al-Malik to spare his nephew punishment by the Umayyad governor of Iraq, al-Hajjaj ibn Yusuf, for joining the wide-scale revolt of Ibn al-Ash'ath.

Family
While he was in Kufa levying troops for his campaign in Bahrayn, Umar was wed to A'isha, a daughter of Talha. A prominent woman of her time, she had previously been married to Mus'ab, and before him, Abd al-Rahman, a son of Abu Bakr. Umar was her last husband and had no children by her.

References

Bibliography

700s deaths
7th-century people from the Umayyad Caliphate
Banu Taym
Generals of the Umayyad Caliphate
People of the Second Fitna
History of Eastern Arabia